Jongnic Bontemps also known as JB is a composer and musician who has worked on over 50 projects in film, shorts, documentary films, TV series and video games. He is the music director for 2016 skateboarding-focused drama film The Land The soundtrack features collaborations with Erykah Badu and Nas including the song "This Bitter Land". He also wrote the music for the 2018 roller skating documentary United Skates. The hip hop influenced documentary premiered in the Tribeca Film Festival.

Bontemps is a classically trained composer with roots in the church and jazz world as a pianist. Coming from Brooklyn, New York he studied music at Yale University, Berklee College of Music and the University of Southern California. becoming a graduate of the Scoring for Motion Picture and Television program at USC. He worked as a software developer and startup executive in New York City and later Silicon Valley before specializing in music. He was selected as a Sundance Lab Composer Fellow in 2013 and received a Time Warner Artist Fellowship in 2014. Bontemps' film Faith Under Fire, premiered on Lifetime in January 2017. His work has been heard in various award winning films at Cannes Film Festival, Warsaw International Film Festival, Pan African Film Festival, American Black Film Festival, as well as on television networks like HBO, BET, Disney and in various cinemas worldwide.

Filmography
Films
2016: Sharia
2016: The Land
2017: Faith Under Fire
2018: United Skates (documentary)
2021: Citizen Ashe (documentary)
2021: My Name is Pauli Murray (documentary)
2022: Wedding Season with Raashi Kulkarni
2023: Transformers: Rise of the Beasts

TV series
2015: Class
2016: Alley Way
2019: College Behind Bars (documentary miniseries)

References

External links
Official website

USC Scoring: Jongnic Bontemps music

Living people
Male film score composers
Male television composers
Video game composers
Year of birth missing (living people)